Məlikli (formerly, Maniklu and Adıgözəlbəyli) is a village de jure in the Agdam District of Azerbaijan, de facto in the Martakert Province of the self-proclaimed Republic of Artsakh. The village had an Azerbaijani-majority prior to their expulsion during the First Nagorno-Karabakh war.

References 

Populated places in Aghdam District